The 10"/40 caliber gun Mark 3 (spoken "ten-inch-forty--caliber") was used for the main batteries of the United States Navy's last generation of armored cruisers, the . The Mark 3s were the last, and most powerful,  guns built for the US Navy.

Design of the Mark 3
Because of this new propellant, projectiles could accelerate all the way along the gun barrel, which allowed for barrels of 40, or more, calibers long. This led to the development of the 10-inch/40 caliber gun.

The Mark 3 was specifically designed for the Tennessee-class armored cruisers, numbered in order after the Mark 1 and Mark 2s, Nos. 27–47, with No. 27 being delivered in February 1906. Nos. 27–31, 36, and 45 were all Mod 0s, with Nos. 37–44, 46, and 47 being Mod 1s. The initial Mod 2s were Nos. 32–35, with other later converted to Mod 2. These were all constructed of gun steel. The 10-inch Mark 3 Mod 0 was built in a length of 40 calibers, had a tube, jacket and four hoops with a locking ring, and a screw box liner, all of which were manufactured out of nickel-steel. The Mark 3 Mod 1s only differed from the Mod 0 in the shape of the front of their chambers and the Mod 2 had a conical nickel-steel liner that was the same length as the tube, with the chamber volume being slightly reduced.

Naval Service

See also

Weapons of comparable role, performance and era 
 10-inch gun M1895 - Army gun of similar size and era
 BL 9.2-inch Mk IX – X naval gun - contemporary British naval and coast defense weapon
 Canon de 240 L Mle 1884 - contemporary French coast defense, siege, and railway weapon

Notes

References

Books
 
Online sources

External links

 Bluejackets Manual, 1917, 4th revision: US Navy 14-inch Mark 1 gun

Naval guns of the United States
254 mm artillery